William Fortescue may also refer to:
William Fortescue (judge) (1687–1749), British judge, Master of the Rolls 1741–1749
William Fortescue (died 1629) (c. 1562–1629), MP for Sudbury, Chipping Wycombe and Stockbridge
William Fortescue, 1st Earl of Clermont (1722–1806), Irish politician
William Fortescue, 2nd Viscount Clermont (1764–1829), Irish politician, nephew of the above
 William Fortescue (1733–1816), Irish politician, MP for Monaghan Borough 1798–1800